Friar Tuck is one of the legendary Merry Men, the band of heroic outlaws in the folklore of Robin Hood.

History
The figure of the jovial friar was common in the May Games festivals of England and Scotland during the 15th through 17th centuries. He appears as a character in the fragment of a Robin Hood play from 1475, sometimes called Robin Hood and the Knight or Robin Hood and the Sheriff, and a play for the May games published in 1560 which tells a story similar to "Robin Hood and the Curtal Friar" (the oldest surviving copy of this ballad is from the 17th century). The character entered the tradition through these folk plays, and he was originally partnered with Maid Marian: "She is a trul of trust, to serue a frier at his lust/a prycker a prauncer a terer of shetes/a wagger of ballockes when other men slepes." His appearance in "Robin Hood and the Sheriff" means that he was already part of the legend around the time when the earliest surviving copies of the Robin Hood ballads were being made.

A friar with Robin's band in the historical period of Richard the Lion-Hearted would have been unlikely as the period predates formal mendicant religious orders in England. Christian religious hermits in England do date as far back as Cuthbert in the late 7th century. In addition, multiple historical references to eremitic hermits unallied with formal orders have been noted, among them Eustace the Monk (a medieval outlaw) and Robert of Knaresborough who was contemporaries with Richard I. However, the association of Robin Hood with Richard I was not made until the 16th century; the early ballad "A Gest of Robin Hood" names his king as "Edward".

What follows is a story which includes different versions of the legend. He was a former monk of Fountains Abbey (or in some cases, St Mary's Abbey in York, which is also the scene of some other Robin Hood tales) who was expelled by his order because of his lack of respect for authority. Because of this, and in spite of his taste for good food and wine, he became the chaplain of Robin's band. In Howard Pyle's The Merry Adventures of Robin Hood, he was specifically sought out as part of the tale of Alan-a-Dale: Robin has need of a priest who will marry Allan to his sweetheart in defiance of the Bishop of Hereford.

In many tales, from "Robin Hood and the Curtal Friar" to The Merry Adventures of Robin Hood, his first encounter with Robin results in a battle of wits in which first one and then the other gains the upper hand and forces the other to carry him across a river. This ends in the Friar tossing Robin into the river.

In some tales, he is depicted as a physically fit man and a skilled swordsman and archer with a hot-headed temper. However, most commonly, Tuck is depicted as a fat, bald and jovial monk with a great love of food and ale, though the two are not mutually exclusive. Sometimes, the latter depiction of Tuck is the comic relief of the tale.

Two royal writs in 1417 refer to Robert Stafford, a Sussex chaplain who had assumed the alias of Frere Tuk. This "Friar Tuck" was still at large in 1429. These are the earliest surviving references to a character by that name.

Portrayals in other media

In the 1891 romantic opera Ivanhoe by Sir Arthur Sullivan and Julian Sturgis, Friar Tuck was played by Avon Saxon.

In the film Robin Hood (1922) he was portrayed by Willard Louis.

In the film, The Adventures of Robin Hood (1938) the character Friar Tuck was played by actor Eugene Pallette as a fat individual fond of food but also skilled with a sword. He was also quick to quarrel with anyone who slighted him, deprived him of his food, or made fun of his girth.

In the film The Bandit of Sherwood Forest (1946) he was portrayed by Edgar Buchanan.

In the film The Prince of Thieves (1948) he was portrayed by Alan Mowbray.

In the film Rogues of Sherwood Forest (1950) he was portrayed by Billy House.
 
In the late 1950s British television series The Adventures of Robin Hood, he was played by Alexander Gauge as a fat friar a tad too devoted to good eating. He is also clearly devoted to the Church and the poor people he serves, using his wits to spare them unjust taxes, provide them education or shelter them from harm. He often uses the power and rights of the Church to good effect against the forces of the Sheriff.

The 1958 Merrie Melodies animated short Robin Hood Daffy featured Porky Pig as a "fat friar", who sought Robin Hood, but refused to believe Daffy Duck was the legendary outlaw. At the end of the cartoon, Daffy becomes "Friar Duck".

In the 1966 television series Rocket Robin Hood, Friar Tuck is again depicted as a traditional fat friar with a tonsure, despite the story taking place in the year 3000. Friar Tuck is memorable for a vignette that played during each episode depicting him in front of a large feast, taking a single bite of each piece of food on the table before throwing it over his shoulder.

The veteran character actor James Hayter played Friar Tuck twice: in The Story of Robin Hood and His Merrie Men (1952) and A Challenge for Robin Hood (1967).

In the 1973 Disney animated Robin Hood, Friar Tuck is a Badger, voiced by Andy Devine. He is taken to be executed at the end of the film in a plot of Prince John's to lure Robin Hood out of hiding but is rescued in time.

In the 1975 TV series When Things Were Rotten, Friar Tuck was played by Dick Van Patten.

In the British Robin of Sherwood TV series of the 1980s, Friar Tuck was played by Phil Rose. In this version, the character reluctantly served the Sheriff of Nottingham's brother, an evil abbot, and also served as Maid Marian's confessor. He helped Marian escape and joined the band alongside her.

In the anime series Robin Hood no Daibōken, Friar Tuck (voiced by Kenichi Ogata) is an old monk who lives on the edge of Sherwood Forest and helps Robin and his friend if needed while offering sage advice.

In the animated series Young Robin Hood, Friar Tuck is made to be a young man around Robin's age and re-titled to Brother Tuck (Voiced by Harry Standjofski). A very young monk, sometimes questioning his choice of being an outlaw. He is very pious and speaks Latin every now and then.

In Robin Hood: Prince of Thieves, Tuck was played by Mike McShane, drawing heavily on the overweight, ale-loving interpretation.

The Mel Brooks film Robin Hood: Men in Tights parodies the character as "Rabbi Tuckman," a self-described "purveyor of sacramental wine and mohel extraordinaire." Brooks, who also plays the character, made Tuckman Jewish (as Brooks himself is Jewish), reprising a gag from Blazing Saddles where Brooks made a cameo as a Jewish Native American.

In the video game Robin Hood: The Legend of Sherwood, Tuck was once again portrayed as Marian's confessor. He joins the band at her request. His enjoyment of alcohol is in the game as one of his abilities involves leaving beer flasks to intoxicate the guards.

In the 1991 film adaptation Robin Hood, Friar Tuck (played by Jeff Nuttall) is portrayed as an itinerant seller of phony relics, who is first mugged and then adopted by the Merry Men. He also confesses to being on the run for killing the nephew of an abbot.

In the 1997 film The Lost World, the second movie in the Jurassic Park franchise, big game hunter Roland Tembo refers to a Pachycephalosaurus as Friar Tuck. He could not read its proper name in his dinosaur identification booklet while traveling over the rough ground towards the beginning of the film.

In 1999, he featured in the video game Age of Empires II: The Age of Kings as a monk.

In the 2004 DreamWorks film Shrek 2 the Fairy Godmother and Prince Charming take King Harold to a fast food restaurant called "Friar's Fat Boy". This is a parody of the American restaurant chain Bob's Big Boy and features a statue of Friar Tuck outside of the restaurant similar to the Big Boy statue from its real-life inspiration. The fictional restaurant returns again in the 2005 Activision published videogame Shrek Super Slam as a fighting location. The game features theme music for the restaurant, which plays in the background of the fight.

Friar Tuck is called Brother and later Father Tuck in Angus Donald's Outlaw Chronicles series – so named as "there were no friars in England at that time"; consisting of Outlaw (2009), Holy Warrior (2010), and King's Man (2011).

The first appearance of Tuck (in this case, not an anachronistic Friar) in the BBC show Robin Hood came in 2009 during its third series. After Robin was hurled over a ravine by Guy of Gisbourne, Tuck finds Robin further downstream. Tuck distracts Guy from the cave he is treating Robin in after Guy is told to look for Robin's body, thus saving Robin's life. He is played by David Harewood and portrayed as African.

Mark Addy plays Friar Tuck in Ridley Scott's Robin Hood (2010). In the film, his hobby is beekeeping, which he uses to make mead and as a weapon against the French.

Data impersonates Friar Tuck in the episode "Qpid" (1991) from Gene Roddenberry's Star Trek: The Next Generation series (4th season, episode 20).

He was portrayed by Michael P. Northey in the TV series Once Upon a Time and its spin-off Once Upon a Time in Wonderland.

He was portrayed by Trevor Cooper in the Doctor Who Series 8 episode, "Robot of Sherwood".

In the VeggieTales show, Robin Good and His Not-So-Merry Men, Archibald Asparagus portrays a version of him named Friar Cluck.

He was portrayed by Tim Minchin in the 2018 film Robin Hood.

Analysis 
Anne K. Kaler noted that a common misconception about Friar Truck is that he was a Franciscan friar; she noted this is not plausible as he could belong to Benedictine, Augustinian or Carmelite orders instead, perhaps be renegade monk or a hermit. She notes that he fits into the Robin Hood story as one of the classic archetypes or stereotypes; here, of a "a laudatory example of Christian clergyman", remembered for qualities such as "joy and good fellowship", a role for which he became immortalized in popular culture since. She compared him to characters such asSanta Claus, Falstaff or Winnie the Pooh, calling him "our “belly cheer,” our Lord of Misrule, our occasional defiance of authority, our spirit of seasonal joy".

Medical references
A pattern in the dermatologic disease trichotillomania (compulsive pulling out of scalp hair) has been named after the pattern of hair of this character.

References

External links
 
 Robin Hood and the Curtal Friar, a 17th-century ballad with additional information
 Robin Hood Spotlight: Robin Hood and the Friar, a page on the 1560s play and modern productions of it

Adventure film characters
Tuck, Friar
Tuck, Friar
Tuck, Friar
Tuck, Friar
People whose existence is disputed
Tuck, Friar